Boris Matveyev (10 December 1929 – 1968) was a Soviet athlete. He competed in the men's discus throw at the 1952 Summer Olympics and the 1956 Summer Olympics.

References

1929 births
1968 deaths
Athletes (track and field) at the 1952 Summer Olympics
Athletes (track and field) at the 1956 Summer Olympics
Soviet male discus throwers
Olympic athletes of the Soviet Union
Place of birth missing